North Carr is the last remaining Scottish lightship .

The North Carr is currently berthed in the Victoria Dock, Dundee, awaiting restoration as an exhibition space.

History
She was built by A. & J. Inglis Ltd, (part of Harland and Wolff) for the Northern Lighthouse Board for £15,000 at Pointhouse Shipyard, Glasgow in 1932 and completed on 27 February 1933. In service she was anchored off Fife Ness until 1975. From then she served as a tourist attraction in Anstruther harbour. She is the third and last vessel to carry the name - the first was borrowed from Trinity House London, the English counterpart of Northern Lighthouse Board. The second was purpose built in Dundee, reported to have sat so low in the water that her decks were always awash and the only way up to the light was up a rope ladder in the rigging - no mean feat at the best of times.

She created quite a stir in Edinburgh on account of her fog horn being tested while lying at  outside Granton in the Firth of Forth. "Hundreds of city dwellers have had no sleep over three consecutive nights"; "The most flagrant individual breach of the peace is as nothing compared with the ceaseless boom and consequent suffering of the past three nights"; "Firth of Forth torment"; "An Edinburgh grievance which has left rankling memories in the selection of Granton for the fog horn test" were typical of statements made and written at the time .

On 8 December 1959, the lightship was the subject of a tragic rescue mission. After the lightship broke her moorings and began to drift in heavy seas, the Broughty Ferry lifeboat (The Mona)  was launched. Her crew of eight was lost when the lifeboat capsized. The lightship and its crew survived and after repair was towed back to its station.

After decommissioning
The lightship was used as a museum in Anstruther for years after she left service. She was purchased from a scrapyard in 2010 for £1 and funds were sought by the charity Tay Maritime Action (Taymara) to restore her as an exhibition space on the Dundee waterfront. However, due to a lack of funding, the lightship is yet to receive the new lick of paint or restoration she needs. In 2021, preparatory work for restoration began with the removal of two lifeboats.

Further reading

References

External links 
 
 
 

Lightships of the United Kingdom
Ships of Scotland
Ships and vessels of the National Historic Fleet
Ships built by Harland and Wolff
History of Dundee